Purves may refer to:

People
Last name
 Purves (surname), a surname of Scottish origin; includes a list of notable people with this surname
Middle name
Listed alphabetically by last name
 Sir Arthur Purves Phayre (1812–1885), English politician and author
 A. Purves Pullen (1909–1992), American voice actor later known by the stage name Dr. Horatio Q. Birdbath
 Elinor Purves Schroeder, American lawyer
 Peter Purves Smith (1912–1949), Australian painter

Places
 Purves, Texas, an unincorporated community in Erath County

Other
 Captain John Purves and His Wife, a 1775 portrait by American painter Henry Benbridge
 Gunning–Purves Building, a historic building in Friendship, Wisconsin
 Home-Purves-Hume-Campbell baronets, a title in the Baronetage of Nova Scotia
 Sir Willie Purves Quaich, an annual rugby union award in Scotland

See also
 
 Purvis (disambiguation)